Liberal Catholic may refer to:
 The Liberal Catholic Church, an independent theosophical denomination not affiliated with Roman Catholicism
 The Liberal Catholic Church International
 The Liberal Catholic Church Grail Community
 Liberal Anglo-Catholicism, a party or theological position within Anglicanism
The liberal current of Roman Catholic thought that was influential, especially in France, in the 19th century and the first half of the 20th.  See Liberal Catholicism.